Mathieu Fonteyn (born February 14, 1985) is a Belgian former swimmer, who specialized in freestyle and butterfly events. He represented his nation Belgium at the 2008 Summer Olympics, placing himself among the top 20 swimmers with an illustrious Belgian record in the 200 m butterfly. Fonteyn trained under the tutelage of the national team's assistant coach Rik Valcke at a local swimming club in Bruges until his abrupt retirement shortly before London 2012 due to sustained injuries.

Fonteyn competed for the Belgian swimming squad in the men's 200 m butterfly at the 2008 Summer Olympics in Beijing. Leading up to the Games, he placed fourth in the top-eight final at the European Championships in Eindhoven, Netherlands with an Olympic A-cut time of 1:56.86. Fonteyn blasted a new Belgian record of 1:56.65 to obtain the seventh spot and nineteenth overall in the last of six preliminary heats, narrowly missing out the top 16 semifinal by just sixth hundredths of a second (0.06) and trailing all-time Olympian and eventual world record holder Michael Phelps, who competed in the same race as Fonteyn, by nearly three seconds.

References

External links
NBC Olympics Profile

1985 births
Living people
Belgian male butterfly swimmers
Olympic swimmers of Belgium
Swimmers at the 2008 Summer Olympics
Belgian male freestyle swimmers
Sportspeople from Leuven